Chandlers Green is a hamlet in the civil parish of Mattingley in the Hart District of Hampshire, England. Its nearest town is Hook approximately 2.5 miles (3 km) away.

Villages in Hampshire